Mahiwa is a place in Tanzania. It is located in the Lindi Rural District of the Lindi Region.

See also 
 Battle of Mahiwa

Populated places in Lindi Region